Tempest of the Gods is an out-of-print collectible card game by Black Dragon Press and was released in July 1995. The core set, called Limited Edition had 270 cards. Some artists that made art for Magic: the Gathering cards, such as Mark Poole, Susan Van Camp, Nene Thomas and Doug Shuler made cards for Tempest of the Gods as well. Tempest: Egyptian Neteru was an expansion for the game that never materialized.

The game is set in Darkurthe, a fantasy world based on a role-playing game of the same name. Allen Varney of The Duelist said it was a "worse clone" of Magic: the Gathering.

References

External links
Preview in Scrye #8

Card games introduced in 1995
Collectible card games